David Lasar (born 5 October 1952) is an Austrian politician who has been a Member of the National Council for the Freedom Party of Austria (FPÖ) since 2016.

References

1952 births
Living people
Members of the National Council (Austria)
Freedom Party of Austria politicians
Austrian Jews